Nicolas Armindo (born 8 March 1982) is a race car driver born in Colmar, France.

As a child he enjoyed Karting and raced in many local races. Starting his career in French Formula Campus in 2001, Armindo moved on to drive in French Formula Renault (2002–2003), Formula Renault 2000 Eurocup (2002–2003) and more recently Porsche Carrera Cup Germany (2004). 

In 2010 Nicolas became champion in Porsche Carrera Cup Germany with Attempto racing .

In 2009 he was third in the FIA GT3 European Championship with Rosberg team with an Audi R8 LMS.

In 2005 he competed in the FIA GT Championship at the race of Istanbul. With position five in his class he scored 4 points. 

He currently holds the record for the fastest lap time in the 6th round of the Porsche Mobil1 Supercup, completing the 5.1-kilometre track in 1:51.692 minutes.

Nicolas Armindo's team is currently IMSA Performance in the Le-Mans Series and Hermes Attempto Racing in the German Porsche Carrera Cup. Together they were able to win the Drivers- and the Team-title in the Carrera Cup in 2010. He also did several guest-starts for Lechner Racing in the Supercup and was able to win in Hockenheim.

In 2011 he raced the Le Mans-Series in a 2010 Porsche 997 GT3 RSR together with Raymond Narac in the GTE-AM-Class and won the Title in the GTE-AM-Class. For the 24 Hours of Le Mans he changed to the GTE-Pro-Class and drove the new 2011 GT3 RSR. He also drove a Porsche 997 GT3 R of the Attempto Team in the ADAC GT-Masters and the 24 Hours of Dubai.

In 2012 he drove the Rolex 24 in Daytona together with Orbit Racing and James Sofronas.

Racing record

Complete Porsche Supercup results
(key) (Races in bold indicate pole position – 2 points awarded 2008 onwards in all races) (Races in italics indicate fastest lap)

† — Did not finish the race, but was classified as he completed over 90% of the race distance.

‡ — Guest driver – Not eligible for points.

Complete GT1 World Championship results

24 Hours of Le Mans results

External links

French racing drivers
French Formula Renault 2.0 drivers
Formula Renault Eurocup drivers
Living people
1982 births
24 Hours of Daytona drivers
European Le Mans Series drivers
FIA GT1 World Championship drivers
24 Hours of Le Mans drivers
Rolex Sports Car Series drivers
Porsche Supercup drivers
British GT Championship drivers
Blancpain Endurance Series drivers
International GT Open drivers
ADAC GT Masters drivers
24 Hours of Spa drivers
ART Grand Prix drivers
Walter Lechner Racing drivers
TDS Racing drivers
Team Rosberg drivers
24H Series drivers
Porsche Carrera Cup Germany drivers